Henckelia wijesundarae is a species of flowering plants in the family Gesneriaceae. It is endemic to Sri Lanka.

References

External links

Didymocarpoideae